dBm0 is an abbreviation for the power in dBm measured at a zero transmission level point.

dBm0 is a concept used (amongst other areas) in audio/telephony processing since it allows a smooth integration of analog and digital chains.  Notably, for A-law and μ-law codecs the standards define a sequence which has a 0 dBm0 output.

Note 1: A consequence for the A-law and μ-law codecs of the 0 dBm0 definition is that they have a respective 3.14 dBm0 and 3.17 dBm0 maximum signal level (ratio between the maximum obtainable sine wave amplitude and the specified reference 0 dBm0 sine wave amplitude).

Note 2: 0 dBm0 is often replaced by or used instead of digital milliwatt or zero transmission level point.

The "unit" dBm0 is used to describe levels of digital signals. E.g. the nominal downlink level in mobile phone telecommunication at the point of interconnection (POI) is -16 dBm0. The unit is derived from its counterpart dBm. Even though digitally represented signals have nothing to do with absolute power levels and cannot be expressed as dBm, the dinosaurs of telephonometrie had problems thinking in levels relative to full scale, so they introduced the completely redundant pseudo-digital unit of "dBm0". It actually connects both, the old world of analogue telecommunication and the new world of digital communication in a weird and unnatural way. The 0 dBm0 level corresponds to the digital milliwatt (DMW) and is defined as the absolute power level at a digital reference point of the same signal that would be measured as the absolute power level, in dBm, if the reference point was analog.

The absolute power in dBm is defined as 10 log (power in mW/1 mW). When the test impedance is 600 Ω resistive, 0 dBm can be referred to a voltage of 775mV, which results in a reference active power of 1 mW. 0 dBm0 corresponds to an overload level of approximately 3 dBm in the A/D conversion.

Given a sine signal of RMS voltage of 0.775 [V], the Power at ZLP in [W] is:

TIA-810   characterizes: "When a 0.775 volt rms analog signal is applied to the coder input, a 0 dBm0 digital code is present at the digital reference. In general, when a 0 dBm0 digital code is applied to the decoder, a 0.775 volt rms analog signal appears at the decoder output. More specifically, when the 0 dBm0 periodic sequence as given in Table 2, in either mu-law or A-law as appropriate, is applied to the decoder at the digital reference point, a 1 kHz, 0.775 volt rms sine-wave signal appears at the decoder output.  0 dBm0 is 3.14 (A-law) or 3.17 (mu-law) dB below digital full scale."

A more commonly used unit for digital signal levels is dB Full Scale or dBFS. The relationship between dBm0 and dBFS is unfortunately ambiguous. It depends how you define rms and peak levels in a sampled system.
The level of 0 dBm0 is defined as specific pattern in a sampled system (see standards referenced below). However, In an A-law coded system, the maximum level of a sinusoidal in such a system is +3.14 dBm0. The ambiguity is if the level is a peak or rms value. Today, the interpretation by many companies tend to go towards the rms interpretation. This means that +3.14 dBm0 = 0dBFS peak and -3dBFS rms. This also means that the same signal has a peak level of +6.14dBm0 peak.

This means that the commonly used Point of Interconnect level of -16dBm0 can be transformed to -22.14dBFS rms in a A-law codec system. (-22.17 dBFS rms in a μ-law codec system).

References

Sources
ETSI
G.711

Radio frequency propagation